The Chippewa Cree Tribe (Officially in ) is a federally recognized tribe on the Rocky Boy Reservation in Montana who are descendants of Cree who migrated south from Canada and Chippewa (Ojibwe) who moved west from the Turtle Mountains in North Dakota in the late nineteenth century. The two different peoples spoke related but distinct Algonquian languages.

This tribe is the southernmost Cree tribe and the westernmost Chippewa (Ojibwe) tribe in North America.

The population was 3,323 at the 2010 census. The Bureau of Indian Affairs' Labor Force Report of 2005 reported 5,656 enrolled members of the tribe.

History
The Chief Asiniiwin (Chippewa) (English translation Stone Child, misnomer Rocky Boy, which conveys an incorrect meaning) and Chief Little Bear (Cree) and their bands were the founders of the Rocky Boy Indian Reservation in north central Montana. At the time, Chippewa-Cree lived throughout present-day Montana, on the Blackfeet and other reservations, as well as in the new towns developed by European-American settlers and immigrants. In January 1902 Asiniiwin petitioned President Theodore Roosevelt for a closed reservation so the landless Chippewa-Cree could settle and get an education. The members were counted in a 1909 census conducted by Thralls B. Wheat, a land allotment agent of the Department of the Interior. This census was certified by the agency in April 1909.

Reflecting the social turmoil of the time, many of Asiniiwin'''s people left the reservation within a decade; others had never relocated there, and their descendants live in towns throughout the Pacific Northwest. For instance, many bought plots of land on Hill 57, outside Great Falls, Montana. Congress passed legislation on September 7, 1916, creating the Rocky Boy Indian Reservation. Those Chippewa-Cree living near Great Falls were not counted as members in the 1917 census of the reservation but were part of the tribe.

In May 1917 the Interior Department compiled another list of residents on the reservation. By then additional Native Americans had migrated there and others had left. Fewer than 45 of the 451 names listed on the "Tentative Roll of the Rocky Boy Indian Reservation" (1917) were Chippewa from the earlier 1909 roll. Many were Cree, descendants of Little Bear's (Imasees) band, and Métis, descendants of the Louis Riel band of mixed-race peoples from the Red River of the North area. According to tribal traditions of absorbing war captives and protecting all children of tribal women, if residents identified as Cree or Chippewa, they were listed as Native American, regardless of whether they had other ancestry. The 1917 roll was approved by the Department of the Interior in July 1917; it has since been the basis for tribal membership rolls and allotments.

The Cree and Métis migrants and their descendants have lived on the Rocky Boy Reservation under self-declared "adopted" status. They and their descendants provided for such "adopted" status in the Chippewa Cree Tribal Constitution, which was written in 1934–1935. It was certified by the Department of the Interior in 1935 under the Indian Reorganization Act. . The constitution provided that members of the tribe who were absent from the reservation for 10 years or more (a ten-year absentee provision) lost their tribal status and were no longer qualified for benefits and membership.

The Chippewa Cree Business Committee, the government of the tribe, recently repealed this provision of the Constitution. As the tribe's government, the Committee retains the authority to address membership issues. The Cree and Métis make up more than 90% of the enrolled members of the tribe.

Language
The principal language of the tribe is Cree, written in Eastern Cree syllabics. There are programs and courses dedicated to the preservation and teaching of the Cree language to the younger generation. There are also efforts to use revenue from sale of Official Tribal vehicle license plate would be used for installation of Cree signage in the community as well as investment in other language revitalization programs.

The status of the Chippewa (Ojibwe) language in the tribe is dire, as there is only one known living speaker of the language after the death of Mr. Duncan Standing Rock Sr. in February 2021. Standing Rock was an integral part of efforts to record and document the language.
Economy
As part of its economic development, the tribe started a business "Plain Green Loans," for online lending to Native Americans who are underserved by the lack of banks on many reservations. Critics such as Delvin Cree (Turtle Mountain Chippewa), a reporter with The Tribal Independent,'' wrote in an opinion piece on Indianz.com that the tribe's practices of high-interest, short-term lending are generally classified as predatory lending. Such loans can result in annualized interest rates as high as 360 percent. Because the Chippewa Cree Tribe is a sovereign nation which enjoys tribal immunity, it is not subject to state laws which seek to prevent usury by regulating high-interest lending.

See also
 Little Shell Tribe of Chippewa Indians of Montana

References

External links
Cree history and past major key events

Cree governments
Cree in Montana
Ojibwe in Montana
Ojibwe governments
Native American tribes in Montana
Federally recognized tribes in the United States
Métis in Montana